Daniel Duncan (July 22, 1806 – May 18, 1849) was a U.S. Representative from Ohio.

Born in Shippensburg, Pennsylvania, Duncan completed preparatory studies.
He attended Jefferson College, Canonsburg, Pennsylvania, in 1825.
He moved to Newark, Ohio, in 1828.
He engaged in mercantile pursuits.
He served as member of the State house of representatives in 1843.
He was an unsuccessful Whig candidate for election to the State senate in 1844.

Duncan was elected as a Whig to the Thirtieth Congress (March 4, 1847 – March 3, 1849).
He was an unsuccessful candidate for reelection in 1848 to the Thirty-first Congress.
He died in Washington, D.C., on May 18, 1849.
He was interred in the Newark Graveyard, Newark, Ohio.

Sources

1806 births
1849 deaths
Politicians from Newark, Ohio
Members of the Ohio House of Representatives
Washington & Jefferson College alumni
People from Shippensburg, Pennsylvania
Whig Party members of the United States House of Representatives from Ohio
19th-century American politicians